KIIT School of Law (KLS) is a private law school in Bhubaneswar, Odisha within the Kalinga Institute of Industrial Technology (KIIT) campus, to which it is affiliated. KLS offers five years integrated course in BA LL.B., BBA LL.B. and BSc LL.B. with honours specialization in different areas of law; LL.M. and PhD.

Academics
KLS offers five-year dual degree integrated courses in BA LL.B., BBA LL.B. and BSc LL.B.. The courses are divided into ten semesters with six papers in each of the semesters. The courses combine law degrees with papers in liberal arts, management and natural sciences. From the Sixth semester, student can choose from Constitutional law, Business law, International trade law, Intellectual property Rights, Crime and Criminology, Human Rights, Taxation law and International law as honours specialization. Other honours papers can be added on request of at least ten students expressing their interest. Students can also take seminar courses.

KLS also offers LL.M. and Ph.D academic programmes. KLS offers one year LL.M. degree program with a spaecialization in International and Comparative Law, Corporate and Commercial Law, Criminal and Security Law, Family and Social Security Law, Constitutional and Administrative Law, Legal Pedagogy and Research.

KLS has six separate departments; Department of Public Law, Department of Private Law, Centre for Alternative Dispute Resolution, Department of Liberal Arts, Department of Business Studies and Department of Natural and physical sciences.

Infrastructure 

Separate hostel facilities are available for boys and girls. It also has two gymnasiums, buses and an in-house computerized Post Office.

Admission 

Admissions are through an All India common test known as KLSAT (KIIT Law School Admission Test), which is generally conducted in the month of May. Apart from the score in the KLSAT, a student must have passed the 10+2 or equivalent exam with at least 50% marks. For BSc LL.B. (hons) applicants 10+2 or equivalent in the science stream with at least 55% marks is a must. Age is no bar.

Admission to LL.M. is through KLSAT where the essential qualification includes a LL.B. degree from a recognized University with at least 55% marks. Students in their final year of Law School may also apply provided that at the time of admission the applicant should submit the required documents.

An applicant seeking admission to PhD program must have: a Master of Laws degree from any recognized university having scored a minimum of 55%; or M.Phil in Law from a recognized university; or master's degree in any social science or allied discipline relevant to the field of research as may be decided by the Director in consultation with the concerned PhD Committee with minimum of 55% marks. The selection is made on the basis of overall academic career, interview and performance in the presentation of research proposal. Candidates having long years of professional experience and exhibiting research aptitude may also be admitted to the program.

Rankings
 
The National Institutional Ranking Framework (NIRF) ranked KIIT School of Law 11 among law colleges in India in 2022.

References

External links 
 Official Website
 An article about KLS in Careergraph section of The Telegraph

Law schools in Odisha
Universities and colleges in Bhubaneswar
Kalinga Institute of Industrial Technology
Educational institutions established in 2007
2007 establishments in Orissa